Homosexuality in football may refer to:
Homosexuality and bisexuality in American football
Homosexuality in association football
Homosexuality in English football